In the Bible, nephilim are offspring of "Sons of God" and "daughters of men".

Nephilim may also refer to:

Books
 Nephilim (manga), a josei manga by Anna Hanamaki
 Nephilim (manhwa), a manhwa by Ryu Kum-chel
 Nephilim, a race of angel-human hybrids that hunt demons in The Mortal Instruments (series) by Cassandra Clare.
Nephilim, a 2013 Swedish novel by Asa Schwarz, translated by Steven T. Murray.

Film and TV
 Ha'Nephilim (The Outsiders), an Israeli television show that involves supernatural beings called Nephilim
 Nephilim (film) a currently in production science fiction action film created and directed by Danny Wilson

Games
 Nephilim (roleplaying game), a 1992 role-playing game by French company Multisim (later Chaosium) in which players take on roles of ancient spirits that can move from one human incarnation to another.
 Nephilim (Xenosaga), a character in the Xenosaga series
 Nephilim (Wing Commander), codename given to an unknown race of squid-like aliens in the video game Wing Commander: Prophecy
 Nephilim (Avernum), or Nephils, a race of feline humanoids in the computer role-playing game series Exile and Avernum
 Nephilim, an extinct race, product of relationships held between fallen angels and humans in Tomb Raider: The Angel of Darkness videogame
 Nephilim, a creature type in the Guildpact expansion for the Magic: The Gathering trading-card game.

Music
 Fields of the Nephilim, a British gothic rock band.
 The Nefilim, a gothic metal band formed as a successor to Fields of the Nephilim

Albums
The Nephilim, an album by Fields of the Nephilim
 Nephilim: Act of God 1, an album by Stu Dent

Songs
 "Nephilim", a song by Katatonia from Night Is the New Day 2009 
 "The Nephilim", a song by AFI from The Art of Drowning 2000
 "The Nephilim Rising", a song by death metal band Behemoth that appeared on their 2004 record Demigod

See also
 Nephilim in popular culture